Vladimir Vyacheslavovich Loginov (born January 1, 1981) is a Russian professional ice hockey defenceman who currently plays for PSK Sakhalin of Asia League Ice Hockey (ALIH).

Loginov previously played in the Russian Superleague and Kontinental Hockey League with Krylya Sovetov Moscow, Salavat Yulaev Ufa, HC Dynamo Moscow, HC Sibir NovosibirskYugra Khanty-Mansiysk, Metallurg Novokuznetsk and Amur Khabarovsk.

References

External links

1981 births
Living people
Amur Khabarovsk players
HC Dynamo Moscow players
Krylya Sovetov Moscow players
Metallurg Novokuznetsk players
Russian ice hockey defencemen
PSK Sakhalin players
Salavat Yulaev Ufa players
HC Sibir Novosibirsk players
HC Spartak Moscow players
HC Yugra players
People from Odintsovo
Sportspeople from Moscow Oblast